This is a list of Boston Red Sox players who have been inducted into the National Baseball Hall of Fame and Museum. The Red Sox are a professional baseball team based in Boston, Massachusetts, a member of the East division within the American League (AL) of Major League Baseball (MLB). From 1901 through 1907, the team was known as the Boston Americans. Since 1912, the Red Sox have played their home games at Fenway Park.

The National Baseball Hall of Fame and Museum, located at 25 Main Street in Cooperstown, New York, is a museum operated by private interests serving as the central point for the study of the history of baseball in the United States and beyond, the display of baseball-related artifacts and exhibits, and the honoring of persons who have excelled in playing, managing, and serving the sport. The Hall's motto is "Preserving History, Honoring Excellence, Connecting Generations". The expression "Hall of Fame" or the metonym "Cooperstown" are often used to refer to the National Baseball Hall of Fame and Museum.

Players

Position players
The following position players are depicted on their Hall of Fame plaques wearing a Red Sox cap insignia. Those in bold have the Red Sox listed as their "primary team" by the Hall of Fame.

The following position players, depicted with a different cap insignia, played for the Red Sox during their careers.

 Luis Aparicio
 Lou Boudreau
 Jesse Burkett
 Orlando Cepeda
 Andre Dawson
 Rickey Henderson
 George Kell
 Heinie Manush
 Tony Pérez
 Al Simmons
 Tris Speaker
 Dick Williams

Pitchers
The following positions players are depicted on their Hall of Fame plaques wearing a Red Sox cap insignia. Those in bold have the Red Sox listed as their "primary team" by the Hall of Fame.

The following pitchers, depicted with a different cap insignia, played for the Red Sox during their careers.

 Jack Chesbro
 Dennis Eckersley
 Waite Hoyt
 Ferguson Jenkins
 Juan Marichal
 Red Ruffing
 Babe Ruth
 Tom Seaver
 John Smoltz
 Cy Young
 Lee Smith

Non-players

See also
 List of members of the Baseball Hall of Fame

References

External links
 National Baseball Hall of Fame and Museum

Hall of Famers